Andre Orlando Hastings (born November 7, 1971) is a former professional American football player who was selected by the Pittsburgh Steelers in the third round of the 1993 NFL Draft. A 6'1", . wide receiver from the University of Georgia, Hastings played in 8 National Football League (NFL) seasons from 1993 to 2000 for the Pittsburgh Steelers, New Orleans Saints, and the Tampa Bay Buccaneers. Hastings's biggest highlight of his career came during Super Bowl XXX when he caught 10 passes for 98 yards and returned 2 punts for 18 yards for the Steelers versus the Dallas Cowboys. He attended Morrow High School in Georgia.

1971 births
Living people
Players of American football from Atlanta
American football wide receivers
Georgia Bulldogs football players
Pittsburgh Steelers players
New Orleans Saints players
Tampa Bay Buccaneers players